The sailing competition in the 2009 Asian Youth Games was held at the National Sailing Centre in Singapore between 30 June and 6 July 2009.

Medalists

Medal table

Results

Boys' Techno 293
30 June – 6 July

Boys' Byte CII
30 June – 6 July

Girls' Techno 293
30 June – 6 July

Girls' Byte CII
30 June – 6 July

Mixed team
30 June – 6 July

References
 Official site

2009 Asian Youth Games events
Asian Youth Games
2009 Asian Youth Games
Sailing competitions in Singapore